"Tatuagem" (English: Tattoo) is a poem written by the Brazilian singer, composer, dramatist and writer Chico Buarque de Holanda and the Brazilian film director, screenwriter, film editor, and actor Ruy Guerra, for the stageplay Calabar (1972–1973). The poem was transformed into a song by Buarque, who recorded it on his album Chico Canta (1973). It was later by recorded by the Brazian singer Elis Regina for her studio album Falso Brilhante (1976).

The poem is written from the point of view of a woman, who is described as being deeply in love with a man. She describes how she wants to stay in the body of her lover as if she were his tattoo.

External links
[ "Tatuagem"] at Allmusic.
"Tatuagem" lyrics at Terra.
.

1973 songs
Brazilian songs
Brazilian poems
Portuguese-language songs